63 Ceti is a star in the constellation of Cetus, located just over a degree south of the celestial equator. With an apparent magnitude of about 5.9, the star is barely visible to the naked eye (see Bortle scale) as a dim, orange-hued point of light. Parallax estimates put it at a distance of about 390 light years (129 parsecs) away from the Earth, and it is drifting further away with a radial velocity of 28 km/s.

63 Ceti has a spectral type of K0III, implying an aging K-type giant star. These types of stars are generally reddish-colored stars with spectral types from K to M, with radii that are 10 to 100 times larger than the Sun. 63 Ceti fits this description, with a radius about 11 times larger than the Sun, a mass of about 1.85 times the Sun, and an effective temperature of 4940 K. 63 Ceti is a red clump giant, indicating it is currently at the horizontal branch, a stage in stellar evolution, and is generating energy through core helium fusion. It is close to a billion years old and is radiating 64 times the luminosity of the Sun from its photosphere at an effective temperature of 4,940 K.

References

K-type giants
Horizontal-branch stars

Cetus (constellation)
Durchmusterung objects
Ceti, 63
013468
010234
0639